Jake Lenox Caprice (born 11 November 1992) is an English professional footballer who plays as a defender for  club Exeter City. He was previously contracted to Blackpool, Crystal Palace, Lincoln City, Woking, Leyton Orient and Tranmere Rovers.

Playing career

Crystal Palace
Caprice joined Crystal Palace in 2004 and progressed through the youth system at the club. In the summer of 2011, he signed his first professional contract on a one-year deal. However, Caprice was released by the club at the end of the season.

Blackpool
In July 2012, he joined Football League Championship side Blackpool on a one-year contract after being released by Palace.

On 13 November 2012, he joined Football League Two side Dagenham & Redbridge on a one-month loan deal. He made his professional debut on 1 December 2012, in a 2–1 defeat to Torquay United, replacing Michael Spillane as a substitute. On 17 December 2012, his loan was extended for a further month. His loan was extended further on 21 January 2013 for another month until 9 February 2013. It was then once again on 18 February 2013 for another month until 9 March 2013.

On 27 August 2013, Caprice joined St Mirren on loan for the season and he made his debut the same day in a 2–1 defeat after extra-time, against Queen of the South, in the Scottish League Cup. Jake ended his loan spell at St Mirren on 31 December 2013, after making 7 appearances, and returned to Blackpool.

After this, Caprice joined Tamworth on loan until the end of the season on 7 March 2014. Caprice made his Tamworth debut the next day, in a 1–0 win over Aldershot Town. Caprice went on to make twelve appearances for Tamworth and upon returning to his parent club, it announced that Caprice was released by the club after they decided not to offer a new contract.

Lincoln City
On 1 August 2014, Caprice signed for Lincoln City on a one-year contract. Caprice made his Lincoln City debut, in the opening game of the season, in a 0–0 draw against Kidderminster Harriers.

However, Caprice was soon first-team limited, as a result of Tom Miller playing in Caprice's position at right-back, though he later regained it back. Despite this, Caprice provided an assist for Ben Tomlinson, in a 3–1 win over Nuneaton Town on 9 December 2014. Despite losing 2–0 against Alfreton Town in the first round of FA Trophy on 13 December 2014, Caprice was named "Man of the Match" by local newspaper Lincolnshire Echo, citing "Plenty of energy and attacking intent down the right from the fullback, taking the game to the visitors as the Imps searched for an equaliser."

Though becoming a regular starter for The Imps with thirty-seven appearances, Caprice was released by the club.

Woking
On 22 June 2015, Caprice signed a pre-contract deal to join National League rivals Woking on 1 July 2015. Caprice was given the number two jersey ahead of the 2015/16 campaign. On 8 August 2015, Caprice made his Woking debut in a 1–0 defeat to Tranmere Rovers, playing 80 minutes before being replaced by Reece Beckles. On 7 June 2016, Caprice was awarded with a new one-year deal preceding his impressive performances towards the end of the 2015–16 campaign. On the opening day of the 2016–17 campaign, Caprice played the full 90 minutes in Woking's 3–1 home defeat to Lincoln City.

Leyton Orient
On 4 July 2017, preceding his release from Woking, Caprice joined fellow National League side Leyton Orient on a two-year deal. On the opening day of the campaign, he made his debut during their shock 2–0 away defeat to Sutton United, featuring for the entire 90 minutes. Throughout the course of the 2017–18 campaign, Caprice was a regular in Orient's side, starting all thirty-five league games he appeared in. However, towards the conclusion of the season, Caprice fell out of favour under manager, Justin Edinburgh and failed to feature again following their 1–1 draw with Ebbsfleet United on 10 March 2018.

On 11 May 2018, Caprice was transfer listed by the club after failing to fit in with Justin Edinburgh's plans, with director of football, Martin Ling stating "he is not what Justin requires from a full-back" in an interview with the East London Advertiser.

Tranmere Rovers
On 28 June 2018, Caprice was signed by newly promoted Tranmere Rovers on a two-year contract. The highlight of Caprice's spell on Merseyside came in the 2019 League Two playoff final at Wembley Stadium when he supplied the cross for Connor Jennings’ 119th minute winner earning Tranmere Rovers promotion to League One.

Exeter City
On 6 August 2020, Caprice was signed by Exeter City.

Career statistics

Honours
Tranmere Rovers
EFL League Two play-offs: 2019

Exeter City
League Two runner-up: 2021–22

References

External links

1992 births
Living people
Footballers from Lambeth
English footballers
Association football defenders
Crystal Palace F.C. players
Blackpool F.C. players
Dagenham & Redbridge F.C. players
St Mirren F.C. players
Tamworth F.C. players
Lincoln City F.C. players
Woking F.C. players
Leyton Orient F.C. players
Tranmere Rovers F.C. players
English Football League players
Scottish Professional Football League players
National League (English football) players
Black British sportspeople
British people of Haitian descent